Christopher Williams (born in London) is an English academic. He held posts at the universities of Bristol, Birmingham, Cairo, Cambridge, London and the United Nations. He is an invited Fellow of the Royal Society of Arts (RSA), and magistrate.

At school he taught himself to play the trumpet and gained a place at the Guildhall School of Music and Drama, London, aged 16. He then became Head of Brass teaching at Wells Cathedral School and a tutor at Dartington College of Arts. In 1980 he left the UK to teach at the Cairo Conservatoire, Egypt, working with Samha El-Kholy, and was principal trumpet of the Cairo Symphony Orchestra. Here he became interested in disadvantage and poverty, and taught at the Al Noor Wal Amal School for blind children. In 1985 he broke the cultural boycott of South Africa to be a principal trumpet with the PACT (SABC) Symphony Orchestra, to experience apartheid. He taught music in the Alexandra, Gauteng township, and co-founded the Johannesburg-based education NGO for street-working children, Street-wise, with Jill (Swart) Kruger. This became the topic of a PhD, his 'first degree'. He then held Fellowships from the Joseph Rowntree Foundation concerning disability rights, and the Economic and Social Research Council within the Global Environmental Change Programme.

Books 

Doing international research: Global and local methods. (2015), London: Sage.
Researching power, elites and leadership. (2012), London: Sage. . .
Leadership accountability in a globalising world. (2006), Palgrave Macmillan. . .
Leaders of integrity: ethics and a code for global leadership. (2001) UN University Leadership Academy: .
Environmental victims: new risks, new injustice, (1998) (Ed.) . .
Terminus Brain. The Environmental Threats to Human Intelligence. Cassel, London/Washington (1997) , .
Endstation Gehirn. Die Bedrohung der menschlichen Intelligenz durch die Vergiftung der Umwelt. German translation by Hans-Joachim Maass. Klett-Cotta, Stuttgart 2003. .
Invisible victims: crime and abuse against people with learning disabilities. (1995) .

Trumpet excursions Chappell: London, (1976). http://catalogue.nla.gov.au/Record/490535

See also 
 Green criminology

References

External links 
 PhD 'Street children and education', British library   http://searchbeta.bl.uk/primo_library/libweb/action/display.do?ct=display&doc=BLL01007147205&indx=1&vl(46689851UI0)=any&srt=rank&vl(freeText0)=street%20children%20and%20education&dum=true&mode=Basic&vid=BLVU1&ct=search&vl(43583880UI1)=all_items&indx=1&frbg=&fn=search&tab=local_tab

Academics of the University of Birmingham
1952 births
Living people
Alumni of the Guildhall School of Music and Drama